is a town located in Kurate District, Fukuoka Prefecture, Japan.

, the town has an estimated population of 7,416 and a density of 540 persons per km2. The total area is 14.28 km2.

References

External links

Kotake official website 

Towns in Fukuoka Prefecture